Percy "Pat" Reid was a Canadian football player who played for the Toronto Argonauts. He won the Grey Cup with them in 1945, 1946 and 1947.

References

Canadian football ends
Toronto Argonauts players
Year of birth missing